Uwe Mehlmann is a paralympic athlete from Germany competing mainly in category B3 sprint events.

Uwe competed in both the 1988 Summer Paralympics for West Germany and the 1992 Summer Paralympics for Germany.  In 1988 he won a silver medal in the 100m behind Australia's David Goodman he also competed in the long jump finishing fourth and the  400m finishing fourth again. At the 1992 games he won gold ahead of Italian Aldo Manganaro in the 200m having broken the games record in the heats and the final, he then swapped places with the Italian to win silver in the 100m and also won bronze in the long jump.

References

Paralympic athletes of West Germany
Paralympic athletes of Germany
Athletes (track and field) at the 1988 Summer Paralympics
Athletes (track and field) at the 1992 Summer Paralympics
Paralympic gold medalists for Germany
Paralympic silver medalists for West Germany
Paralympic silver medalists for Germany
Paralympic bronze medalists for Germany
German male sprinters
German male long jumpers
Living people
Year of birth missing (living people)
Medalists at the 1988 Summer Paralympics
Medalists at the 1992 Summer Paralympics
Paralympic medalists in athletics (track and field)
Visually impaired sprinters
Visually impaired long jumpers
Paralympic sprinters
Paralympic long jumpers
20th-century German people